Richard Goode (born June 1, 1943) is an American classical pianist who is especially known for his interpretations of Mozart and Beethoven.

Early life
Goode was born in the East Bronx, New York. He studied piano with Elvira Szigeti, Claude Frank, and Nadia Reisenberg at Mannes College - The New School for Music (where he is a faculty member), and Rudolf Serkin and Mieczysław Horszowski at the Curtis Institute of Music in Philadelphia, Pennsylvania.

Career 
He has made many recordings, including several Mozart piano concerti with the Orpheus Chamber Orchestra and the music of Schubert, Schumann, Brahms and Bach. Goode was the first American-born pianist to record the complete Beethoven piano sonatas. He regularly appears at the world's leading venues. He premiered works written for him by Carlos Chávez, George Perle, Robert Helps and others. His chamber-music partners included Dawn Upshaw, Richard Stoltzman and Alexander Schneider. 

From 1999 - 2013, Goode was the Artistic Co-Director of Marlboro Music School and Festival with Mitsuko Uchida.

Goode married violinist Marcia Weinfeld.

A literary portrait of Richard Goode appears in David Blum's book, Quintet: Five Journeys toward Musical Fulfillment (Cornell University Press, 1999). It originally appeared as an article in the 29 June 1992 issue of The New Yorker.

Recognition

Grammy Award for Best Chamber Music Performance:
Richard Goode & Richard Stoltzman for Brahms: The Sonatas for Clarinet & Piano, Op. 120 (1983)
He is a recipient of Yale University's Sanford Medal.
Young Concert Artists International Auditions in 1961
First Prize in the Clara Haskil Competition in 1973 
Avery Fisher Prize in 1980.

Discography

 Benita Valente, Richard Goode / Mozart • Schubert • Brahms • Hugo Wolf. - Benita Valente Sings Mozart Schubert Brahms Wolf (LP). Desmar, Telefunken. 1976
 Robert Schumann - Richard Goode - Humoreske, Op. 20 / Fantasia In C, Op. 17 Nonesuch. 1981
 Richard Stoltzman, Richard Goode - Brahms* - The Sonatas For Clarinet And Piano, Op. 120 RCA Red Seal. 1982
 Franz Schubert - Richard Goode - Sonata In A Major, D. 959 / Klavierstück In E Flat Minor, D. 946, No. 1 Nonesuch. 1985
 George Perle - Richard Goode, Music Today Ensemble, Gerard Schwarz - Serenade No. 3 For Piano And Chamber Orchestra / Ballade / Concertino For Piano, Winds And Timpani. Nonesuch. 1985
 Franz Schubert, Richard Goode - Schubert: Sonata In B-Flat Major, D. 960 Opus Posthumous • Allegretto D. 915 • Impromptu D. 935 No. 2 Elektra/Asylum/Nonesuch Records. 1985
 Richard Goode / Johannes Brahms - Richard Goode Plays Brahms Elektra Nonesuch. 1987
 Beethoven, Late Sonatas, Opus 101, 106 ( Hammerklavier ), 109, 110, 111 (2xLP, Album) Nonesuch Digital. 1988
 Schumann, Kathleen Battle, John Aler, Charles Wadsworth, Richard Goode - Spanische Liebeslider, Andante And Variations, Piano Quartet (CD) ASV Digital. 1988
 Richard Stoltzman / Richard Goode : Schumann* / Schubert* - Fantasiestücke, Op. 73, 3 Romances, Op. 94 / 2 Sonatinas, D. 384, 385 (Cass, CrO) RCA Victor Red Seal. 1988
 Richard Stoltzman, Richard Goode, Lucy Chapman Stoltzman* - Bartok - Contrasts; Stravinsky - L'Histoire Du Soldat - Suite; Ives - Largo; Songs (Cass, Album). RCA Victor Red Seal. 1990
 Franz Schubert - Richard Goode - Sonata In C Minor, D. 958 • Ländler, Op. 171, D. 790 Elektra Nonesuch. 1992
 Mozart - Richard Goode, Orpheus Chamber Orchestra - Piano Concertos No. 18 & 20 (CD, Album) Nonesuch. 1996
 Chopin (CD, Album) Nonesuch. 1997
 Mozart - Richard Goode, Orpheus Chamber Orchestra - Piano Concertos No. 25 & 9 Nonesuch. 1998
 Richard Goode / Johann Sebastian Bach - Bach Partitas Nos. 4, 2, And 5 Nonesuch. 1999
Mozart - Richard Goode, Orpheus Chamber Orchestra - Piano Concertos No. 23 & 24 (CD, Album) Nonesuch. 1999
 Mozart - Richard Goode, Orpheus Chamber Orchestra - Piano Concertos (No. 27 In B-flat Major, K.595 / No. 19 In F Major K.459) (CD) Nonesuch. 2000
 Bach Partitas Nos. 1, 3 & 6 Nonesuch. 2003
 Mozart Nonesuch. 2005
 Beethoven, Richard Goode, Ivan Fischer, Budapest Festival Orchestra - The Five Piano Concertos (3xCD + Box) Nonesuch. 2009
 Mozart - Richard Goode, Orpheus Chamber Orchestra - Piano Concertos (No. 17 In G, K.453 / No. 23 In A, K.488) (CD, Album) Nonesuch - 9 79042-2
 Beethoven, Richard Goode - The Complete Sonatas (10xCD + Box) Elektra Nonesuch, Book-Of-The-Month Records - 9 79328-2

References

External links
Richard Goode Biography
Interview with Richard Goode, February 19, 1990

American classical pianists
American male classical pianists
1943 births
Living people
Grammy Award winners
Jewish classical pianists
Curtis Institute of Music alumni
20th-century American pianists
20th-century classical pianists
21st-century classical pianists
20th-century American male musicians
21st-century American male musicians
21st-century American pianists